Blake Christopher Young (born November 13, 1986), who used to go by the stage name Young Chozen, is a Christian hiphop artist.

Early life
Born and raised by a single mother in Los Angeles, California, Young grew up dealing with divorce, sexual molestation, drugs, gang violence, and bullying.

Career
Young has appeared on the Disney Channel series The Suite Life on Deck and guest hosted ESPN's Elite 30. His song "Glow" reached number 3 in the Netherlands Christian and Gospel Music Chart in February 2013. He toured Australia in 2013, supporting Evermore in Perth.

Young appeared in a motivational speech with other public figures, where he went to schools like Willetton Senior High School on the 24th of August 2016 9:30am.

Albums
Class President 
GLOW

References 

1986 births
Living people
West Coast hip hop musicians
Rappers from Los Angeles
21st-century American rappers